The province of Lodi is a province in the Lombardy region of Italy. Its provincial capital is the city of Lodi. As of 2017, it has a population of 229,541 inhabitants over an area of c. , giving the province a population density of 293.2 inhabitants per square kilometre. The provincial president is Francesco Passerini.

History
The city of Lodi was first settled during the fifth century BC by Celtic tribes, before being occupied by the Romans in 222 BC; by 89 BC it was called Laus Pompeia, the central city of the Lodi Vecchio. The history of the province in the Lombard and Frankish period is poorly documented, but the city of Lodi controlled the important trading route from Milan southwards to Cremona, Piacenza and the lower stretches of the River Lambro. In 1025, the German emperor Conrad II granted certain rights to the Archbishop of Milan which caused land ownership to change and tensions in the region to flare. Allied with the Holy Roman Emperor but independent, Laus Pomperia fought against the Milanesi in the twelfth century, and the city was destroyed in 1111 and again in 1158, which marked the end of the city on the old location. A request made of Frederick I, Holy Roman Emperor, to rebuild the city near the Adda River was granted. The city, however, joined his opponents, the Lombard League, in 1167. Its citizens fought against Frederick at the Battle of Legnano in 1176. Still, it continued to have problems with Milan (also a member of the Lombard League) until the city was conquered in 1335 by lord of Milan Azzone Visconti.

It remained peaceful until it was invaded in the 1490s. The first significant Italian victory by Napoleon took place in the province on 10 May 1796, where the 5,000 men-strong forces of Napoleon defeated Austrian forces of 10,000 men. It fell under Austrian rule until the Austrians left the city in 1859 and it was ruled by Marshal Patrice de MacMahon, Duke of Magenta's French forces from 10 June 1859. It later became a part of the kingdom of Italy and became a component of the province of Milan.

Geography
The province of Lodi is one of twelve provinces in the region of Lombardy in northwestern Italy. The province is bounded on the east by the Province of Cremona, the Metropolitan City of Milan to the north and by the Province of Pavia to the west. The land is mostly gently sloping or flat and the soil is alluvial loam. It is used to grow fodder crops, which are mown up to eight times a year, rice, wheat, maize, sugarbeet and vegetables.

See also
List of communes of the Province of Lodi

References

External links
Provincia di Lodi 

 
Lodi
Lodi